Richenthal may refer to:

Richenthal, Reiden, a former municipality in the canton of Lucerne, Switzerland, now part of the municipality of Reiden
Ulrich of Richenthal (died c. 1438), chronicler of the Council of Constance
David Richenthal, lawyer and Broadway theater producer

See also 
Reichenthal